The Robert C. Maynard Institute for Journalism Education (MIJE), is an American nonprofit organization that trains people of color to become journalists, editors and newspaper managers.  It also seeks to increase their presentation in media outlets. MIJE has graduated over 1,000 students.

Founded in 1977, MIJE is based in Emeryville, California.

Background
Founded in 1977 as the Institute for Journalism Education, began as a volunteer project of nine working journalists. It soon progressed into an organization promoting diversity in media staffing, content and business operations.

IJE was renamed in 1993 in honor of co-founder Robert C. Maynard. The organization is currently led by co-executive directors Evelyn Hsu and Martin G. Reynolds.

Programs
MIJE offers several programs of study each year. Since the 1970s, MIJE has shifted the focus from entry-level reporters to experienced editors and managers and from newsroom basics to advanced skill development.

Summer Program for Minority Journalists (SPMJ) 
Held at the University of California, Berkeley, the Summer Program for Minority Journalists (SPMJ) graduated more than 200 students during the 1970s and 1980s. Many SPMJ graduates have become editors, managers, and publishers. Others have earned awards such as the Pulitzer Prize.

Editing Program
Beginning in 1980, the six-week Editing program has trained nearly 200 journalists of color for placement in editing positions and emphasizes on improving copy-editing skills. The program takes place at the Donald W. Reynolds School of Journalism at the University of Nevada, Reno campus.

Management Training Center 
In 1985, the MIJE’s Management Training Center (MTC) became the nation’s first program to train both news and business professionals . This arrangement resulted in career advancements for over 200 multicultural newspaper managers.

Media Academy
The Media Academy prepares students for promotions to entry-level management roles on both the editorial and business sides of newspapers. The year-long program is overseen by MIJE in collaboration with the Newspaper Association of America.

Previous programs

Cross-Media Journalism
Piloted in 2000 at Columbia University’s Graduate School of Journalism, the program trained over 35 seasoned professionals to operate more effectively in a dynamic, multimedia environment. The weeklong program covered the framework for journalistic narrative in print, broadcast, and the Internet utilizing the “Fault Lines” of race, class, gender, generation, and geography.

References

External links
The Maynard Institute official website
Poynter article about Maynard

1977 establishments in California
Journalism schools in the United States
Non-profit organizations based in California
American journalism organizations
Organizations based in Oakland, California
Maynard family